The 1961–62 Detroit Red Wings season was the Red Wings' 36th season.

Offseason

Regular season

Final standings

Record vs. opponents

Schedule and results

Playoffs
They didn't qualify

Player statistics

Regular season
Scoring

Goaltending

Note: GP = Games played; G = Goals; A = Assists; Pts = Points; +/- = Plus-minus PIM = Penalty minutes; PPG = Power-play goals; SHG = Short-handed goals; GWG = Game-winning goals;
      MIN = Minutes played; W = Wins; L = Losses; T = Ties; GA = Goals against; GAA = Goals-against average;  SO = Shutouts;

Awards and records

Transactions

See also
1961–62 NHL season
 1962 in Michigan

References

External links

Detroit
Detroit
Detroit Red Wings seasons
Detroit Red Wings
Detroit Red Wings